Frederic Wood Jones FRS (January 23, 1879 –  September 29, 1954), usually referred to as Wood Jones, was a British observational naturalist, embryologist, anatomist and anthropologist, who spent considerable time in Australia.

Biography
Jones was born in London, England, and wrote extensively on early humans, including their arboreal adaptations (Arboreal Man), and was one of the founding fathers of the field of modern physical anthropology. A friend of Le Gros Clark, Wood Jones was also known for his controversial belief in the view that acquired traits could be inherited, and thus his opposition to Darwinism. He taught anatomy and physical anthropology at London School of Medicine for Women, University of Adelaide, University of Hawaii, University of Melbourne, University of Manchester and the Royal College of Surgeons of England.

Jones was president of the Royal Society of South Australia in 1927, and was awarded the RM Johnston Memorial Medal by The Royal Society of Tasmania in 1925 and the Clarke Medal by the Royal Society of New South Wales in 1941. He was elected President of the Anatomical Society of Great Britain and Ireland for 1943 to 1945.

In 1910 in London, he married Gertrude Clunies-Ross, the fourth daughter of George Clunies-Ross.

Tarsian hypothesis

Jones favoured a long separate, non-anthropoid ancestry for humans. He believed that science should search as far back as the primitive tarsioid stock to find a sufficiently generalised form that would be the common ancestor of man, monkeys and the anthropoid apes. The tarsian hypothesis of Jones, which he held to from 1918 until his death, claimed that the human line of development did not diverge from that of apes or monkeys but from much earlier, before the Oligocene 30 million years ago, from a common ancestor with a primitive primate group of which the only other survivor is the Tarsier. Wood Jones in his The Ancestry Of Man (1923) described his Tarsian hypothesis as follows:

Wood Jones explained common structural features between Man and the apes (and monkeys) through convergent evolution. In 1948 he wrote:

Philosophy

Jones rejected organised religion and idea of an anthropomorphic deity. He believed there was a cosmic mind behind nature. He defended the holistic philosophy of Jan Smuts and was a strong critic of Darwinism. His philosophical views are discussed in his book Design and Purpose (1942).

Publications

As well as numerous scientific papers, books he authored, coauthored and edited include:
Jones, Frederic Wood. (1912). Coral and Atolls. A History and Description of the Keeling-Cocos Islands, with an account of their Fauna and Flora, and a Discussion of the Method of Development and Transformation of Coral Structures in General. Lovell, Reeve & Co Ltd: London.
Jones, Frederic Wood. (1916). Arboreal Man. Edward Arnold: London.
Jones, Frederic Wood. (1918). The Problem of Man's Ancestry. Society for Promoting Christian Knowledge.
Jones, Frederic Wood. (1920). The Principles of Anatomy as Seen in the Hand. J. & A. Churchill: London.
Jones, Frederic Wood. (1923). The Ancestry Of Man. Douglas Price Memorial Lecture, No.3. R G. Gilles & Co.: Brisbane.
Jones, Frederic Wood. (1923). The Position of Anatomy in the Modern Medical Curriculum and the Conception of Cytoclesis. Hassell Press: Adelaide.
Jones, Frederic Wood. (1923–25). The Mammals of South Australia. Parts I-III. Handbooks of the Flora and Fauna of South Australia. Government Printer: Adelaide.
Jones, Frederic Wood. (1925). Unscientific Essays. Edward Arnold & Co: London.
Jones, Frederic Wood. (1929). Man's Place Among the Mammals. Edward Arnold: London.
Jones, Frederic Wood. (1934). Sea Birds Simplified. Edward Arnold & Co.: London.
Jones, Frederic Wood. (1934). Unscientific Excursions. Edward Arnold & Co: London.
Jones, Frederic Wood. (1939). Life and Living. Kegan Paul: London.
Jones, Frederic Wood. (1942). Design and Purpose. Kegan Paul: London.
Jones, Frederic Wood. (1943). Habitat and Heritage. Kegan Paul, Trench, Trubner: London.
Jones, Frederic Wood. (1946). Structure and Function as Seen in the Foot. Bailliere Tindall and Cox: London.
Jones, Frederic Wood. (1946). The Principles of Anatomy as Seen in the Hand.  Bailliere Tindall and Cox: London.
Jones, Frederic Wood. (1948). Hallmarks of Mankind. Bailliere Tindall and Cox: London.
Jones, Frederic Wood. (1953). Trends of Life. Edward Arnold: London.
Jones, Frederic Wood. (Ed.). (1946). Buchanan's Manual of Anatomy. Bailliere Tindall and Cox: London.
Jones, Frederic Wood; & Porteus, Stanley David. (1928). Matrix of the Mind. University of Hawaii: Honolulu.

References

1879 births
1954 deaths
Fellows of the Royal Society
British anthropologists
British naturalists
People educated at Enfield Grammar School
20th-century British writers
British anatomists
Lamarckism
Scientists from London
Academic staff of the University of Adelaide
University of Hawaiʻi faculty
Academic staff of the University of Melbourne
Academics of the Victoria University of Manchester
Fellows of the Royal College of Surgeons